Robert Bruce Dickson (born April 22, 1931) is a Canadian ice hockey player. He was a member of the Edmonton Mercurys that won a gold medal at the 1952 Winter Olympics in Oslo, Norway. He is the last living member of that team.

References

1931 births
Ice hockey players at the 1952 Winter Olympics
Living people
Olympic gold medalists for Canada
Olympic ice hockey players of Canada
Canadian people of Scottish descent
Olympic medalists in ice hockey
Medalists at the 1952 Winter Olympics
Ice hockey people from Edmonton
Canadian ice hockey right wingers